Danish philosophy has a long tradition as part of Western philosophy.

Perhaps the most influential Danish philosopher was Søren Kierkegaard, the creator of Christian existentialism, which inspired the philosophical movement of Existentialism. Kierkegaard had a few Danish followers, including Harald Høffding, who later in his life moved on to join the movement of positivism.  Among Kierkegaard's other followers include Jean-Paul Sartre who was impressed with Kierkegaard's views on the individual, and Rollo May, who helped create humanistic psychology.

Danish culture
Philosophy by country
Western philosophy by country